Baraniganun (also Romanized as Bāranīganūn; also known as Bāranganān and Barenganān) is a village in Valupey Rural District, in the Central District of Savadkuh County, Mazandaran Province, Iran. At the 2006 census, its population was 8, in 4 families.

References 

Populated places in Savadkuh County